Bounmy Thephavong (born 12 December 1965) is a Laotian boxer. He competed in the men's light flyweight event at the 1988 Summer Olympics.

References

External links
 

1965 births
Living people
Laotian male boxers
Olympic boxers of Laos
Boxers at the 1988 Summer Olympics
Place of birth missing (living people)
Light-flyweight boxers